Year 1041 (MXLI) was a common year starting on Thursday (link will display the full calendar) of the Julian calendar.

Events 
 By place 
 Byzantine Empire 
 December 10 – Emperor Michael IV (the Paphlagonian) dies after a 6-year reign. His wife, Empress Zoë, elevates (on advice by her lover John the Orphanotrophos) her adoptive son to the throne of the Byzantine Empire, as Michael V Kalaphates. Shortly after, Michael comes into conflict with his uncle John, and banishes him to a monastery.

 Europe 
 March 17 – Battle of Olivento: Norman troops and their Lombard allies, led by William I (Iron Arm), are victorious against the Byzantines at the feet of the Monte Vulture, near the River Olivento in Apulia. 
 May 4 – Battle of Montemaggiore: Lombard-Norman rebel forces, led by William I, are again victorious, and defeat a Byzantine army (18,000 men) on a hill named Montemaggiore, near the River Ofanto.
 September 3 – Battle of Montepeloso: Lombard-Norman rebel forces, led by William I, defeat the Byzantines at Montepeloso. During the battle, Boioannes, governor of the Catepanate of Italy, is captured.
 Winter – Battle of Ostrovo: The Byzantines, with the help of the Varangian Guard, led by Harald Hardrada (future king of Norway), defeat the Bulgarian troops, near Lake Ostrovo in Greece.

 England 
 Edward the Confessor returns to England from exile in Normandy, to become the heir of his half-brother Harthacnut, as king of England. He reduces the navy from 60 to 32 ships, due to the tax burden.
 The city of Worcester rebels against the taxes of Harthacnut. Edward enlists the help of Earl Godwin of Wessex (to support him in the right to claim the English throne) and marries his daughter Edith.

 Africa 
 The Zirid Dynasty rejects Shi'ite obedience and Fatimid domination, and recognizes the Abbasids as their overlords.

 Asia 
 The number of enlisted soldiers in the Song Dynasty Chinese military reaches well over 1,250,000 troops, an increase since 1022, when there were a million soldiers (approximate date).

Births 
 Ōe no Masafusa, Japanese poet (d. 1111)
 Raymond IV (Saint-Gilles), French nobleman (d. 1105)

Deaths 
 February 4 – Fujiwara no Kintō, Japanese poet (b. 966)
 December 10 – Michael IV, Byzantine emperor (b. 1010) 
 Adolf II of Lotharingia, German nobleman (b. 1002)
 Akazome Emon, Japanese waka poet (approximate date)
 Eadwulf IV, ruler of Bamburgh
 Edmund of Durham (or Eadmund), English bishop
 Gangeyadeva, Indian ruler of the Kalachuri Dynasty
 Mac Beathaidh mac Ainmire, Irish poet and Chief Ollam
 Muhammad, sultan of the Ghaznavid Empire (b. 998)
 Muhammad ibn Rustam Dushmanziyar, Buyid emir
 Peter Delyan, Bulgarian rebel leader and ruler (tsar)
 Sampiro, Spanish bishop, politician and intellectual 
 Tancred of Hauteville, Norman nobleman (b. 980)
 Vikramabahu (or Kassapa), king of Sri Lanka (b. 1017)

References